Emma Karolin Rienas (born 15 October 1982) is a retired Swedish sprinter. She represented her country in the 4 × 100 meters relay at the 2005 World Championships. Additionally, she finished sixth in the same event at the 2010 European Championships.

International competitions

Personal bests
Outdoor
100 metres – 11.54 (+1.8 m/s, Sundsvall 2009)
200 metres – 24.00 (0.0 m/s, Sollentuna 2006)
Indoor
60 metres – 7.32 (Turin 2009)
200 metres – 25.18 (Malmö 2005)

References

1982 births
Living people
Swedish female sprinters
World Athletics Championships athletes for Sweden
People from Storfors Municipality
Sportspeople from Värmland County